The Spice Boys was a media pejorative used to describe a group of high-profile Liverpool F.C. footballers in the mid-late 1990s, typically Jamie Redknapp, David James, Steve McManaman, Robbie Fowler and Jason McAteer, but occasionally teammates such as Stan Collymore and Paul Ince. The name was a play on the Spice Girls, who were extremely popular at the same time and famed for their 'Girl Power' persona.

Term
The term ‘Spice Boys’ was coined by the Daily Mirror following (unfounded) tabloid rumours that Fowler was dating Spice Girl Baby Spice (Emma Bunton).

In the late 1990s, the influx of television and marketing revenue from the newly revamped and globally marketed FA Premier League saw footballers’ wages soar. Photogenic players such as Jamie Redknapp and Welshman Ryan Giggs emerged as merchandising and mass-marketed ‘poster boys’ of the British game, with many players landing high-profile product endorsement contracts, such as Jason McAteer’s with Head & Shoulders, while David James was signed up as an Armani underwear model in 1997. With the fame of Premier League footballers reaching unprecedented levels, criticism of the perceived underachievement of the Liverpool squad soon followed. The Daily Telegraph later described the ‘Spice Boys’ as a "Group of high-spirited, fun-loving young players who were a central feature of Liverpool's talented and entertaining, but perpetually under-achieving, squad of the Nineties. At least, that's the generous description. Others saw them as just an irresponsible bunch who were a bad influence in the dressing-room and should not be given house room."

Incidents
Several incidents around the behaviour of the so-called Spice Boys generated major media attention, notably the squad’s decision to wear matching cream Armani suits to the 1996 FA Cup Final - a game they went on to lose to key rivals Manchester United. Robbie Fowler told the Daily Mirror in 2008 that "People still remind me about the white suits all the time. It's one of those things - if we had won the game nobody would have mentioned it but we lost and it has become infamous."

McManaman and Fowler were also associated with the controversial "dentist's chair" story prior to Euro 1996. Rumours of a controversial 1998 Christmas party also filled the press.

Decline of use
Following the departure of Liverpool manager Roy Evans in 1998, with his co-manager Gérard Houllier taking full charge, the majority of the Spice Boy players were slowly transferred out of the squad or put under greater pressure to perform. The term gradually declined in media use, although was briefly revived when, in 2004, several of the ex-Liverpool team were reunited at Manchester City, under Kevin Keegan.

See also
Crazy Gang of Wimbledon F.C.
Fergie's Fledglings of Manchester United F.C.

References

Liverpool F.C.
Nicknamed groups of association football players
1995–96 FA Premier League
1996–97 FA Premier League